Christian Ridge Historic District is a national historic district located at Frankfort, Clinton County, Indiana.  The district encompasses 430 contributing buildings and 2 contributing structures in a predominantly residential section of Frankfort. The district developed between about 1832 and 1952, and includes notable examples of Queen Anne, Colonial Revival, and Bungalow / American Craftsman style residential architecture.  Located in the district is the separately listed Old Frankfort Stone High School.

It was added to the National Register of Historic Places in 2003.

References

Houses on the National Register of Historic Places in Indiana
Historic districts on the National Register of Historic Places in Indiana
Queen Anne architecture in Indiana
Colonial Revival architecture in Indiana
Historic districts in Clinton County, Indiana
National Register of Historic Places in Clinton County, Indiana